Forrester is a research and advisory company that offers a variety of services including research, consulting, and events.

Forrester has headquarters in Cambridge, MA and London. Its North American offices are located in Austin, TX; Dallas, TX; McLean, VA; Nashville, TN; New York, NY; Norwalk, CT; and San Francisco, CA. It also has offices in the following EMEA and APAC locations: Amsterdam, Beijing, Frankfurt, New Delhi, Paris, Singapore, Stockholm, Sydney, and Tel Aviv.

History 
Forrester was founded in July 1983 by George Forrester Colony, now chairman of the board and chief executive officer, in Cambridge, Massachusetts. The company's first report, "The Professional Automation Report," was published in November 1983. In November 1996, Forrester announced its initial public offering of 2,300,000 shares. In February 2000, the company announced its secondary public offering of 626,459 shares. 

In 2011, Forrester announced the arrival of a new era, the “age of the customer,” that would reshape the way organizations succeed and grow. Forrester anchored its strategy, organization, and research around the age of the customer to help its customers adapt to a market driven by customers. 

Forrester has made a number of acquisitions over the past 20 years, including Fletcher Research, a British Internet research firm, in November 1999; FORIT GmbH, a German market research and consulting firm, in October 2000; Giga Information Group, a Cambridge, Massachusetts-based information technology research and consulting company, in February 2003; New York City-based Jupiter Research, in July 2008;
Strategic Oxygen on December 1, 2009; Springboard Research on May 12, 2011; FeedbackNow and GlimpzIt in 2018; and SiriusDecisions, a business-to-business research and advisory firm, in 2019.

Forrester serves clients in North America, Europe, and Asia Pacific. Forrester's head office has always been in Cambridge, Massachusetts: first, near Harvard Square, then, in Technology Square, and now in Cambridge Discovery Park (Acorn Park).

Leaderships 
 George F. Colony, chairman of the board and CEO.

References

External links 
 

1983 establishments in Massachusetts
 Companies based in Cambridge, Massachusetts
 Companies established in 1983
 Market research companies of the United States
Research and analysis firms of the United States